Stanley Holbrook Docking (13 December 1914 – 27 May 1940) was an English professional footballer who played as an inside-left in the Football League for Newcastle United and Tranmere Rovers.

Personal life
Docking served as an Aircraftman 2nd Class in the Royal Air Force Volunteer Reserve during the Second World War. He died of apparent disinfectant poisoning at Royal Victoria Infirmary, Newcastle-upon-Tyne on 27 May 1940. Docking was buried at Whitley Bay (Hartley South) Cemetery.

Career statistics

References

1914 births
1940 deaths
Footballers from County Durham
Association football inside forwards
English footballers
Birtley F.C. players
Newcastle United F.C. players
Tranmere Rovers F.C. players
Hartlepool United F.C. wartime guest players
Royal Air Force Volunteer Reserve personnel of World War II
Royal Air Force personnel killed in World War II
Deaths by poisoning
Military personnel from County Durham
Accidental deaths in England
Royal Air Force airmen